E501 may refer to:
 E number 501, a food additive
 E501 series, electric multiple unit operating in Japan